The Togoland Congress (TCP; was a political party formed in 1951 which had won three seats in the Gold Coast elections of April 1954 and two seats in the July 1956 elections, but did not survive for long afterwards. The Togoland Congress's goal was to campaign for the unification of the Ewe people in British Togoland and French Togoland as a separate Ewe state; however the party yet again failed in the May 1956 UN plebiscite held in British Togoland, which had resulted in the unification of British Togoland and the Gold Coast.

References

1951 establishments in Gold Coast (British colony)
British Togoland
Defunct political parties in Ghana
Political parties disestablished in 1956
Political parties established in 1951